Athylia ornata is a species of beetle in the family Cerambycidae. It was described by Fisher in 1925. It was first identified at Mount Banahaw in the Philippines.

References

Athylia
Beetles described in 1925